Josip Suton (born 14 November 1988), is a Croatian futsal player who plays for MNK Split Brodosplit Inženjering and the Croatia national futsal team.

References

External links
UEFA profile

1988 births
Living people
Futsal forwards
Croatian men's futsal players